Alphas is an American superhero drama television series created by Zak Penn and Michael Karnow. It follows a group of people with superhuman abilities, known as "Alphas", as they work to prevent crimes committed by other Alphas.

The series was broadcast in the United States on the cable channel Syfy and was a co-production between BermanBraun and Universal Cable Productions. It premiered on July 11, 2011. After initial reports that the show was canceled, on September 7, 2011, Alphas was renewed for a 13-episode second season, which premiered on Monday, July 23, 2012, at 10 p.m. ET. On January 16, 2013, Syfy announced that the program would not be returning for a third season, ending the series with an unresolved cliffhanger.

Plot
The series follows five people, known as "Alphas", led by noted neurologist and psychiatrist Lee Rosen (David Strathairn), as they investigate criminal cases involving other suspected Alphas.

Rosen and his team operate under the auspices of the Defense Criminal Investigative Service, the criminal investigative arm of the U.S. Department of Defense. While investigating these crimes, it does not take the team too long to discover that a group known as "Red Flag", which was thought defeated and eliminated long ago, is using other Alphas to commit crimes.

Cast

 David Strathairn as Dr. Lee Rosen – A specialist in the study of people with super abilities, whom he has dubbed "Alphas". He leads a government-sponsored team of Alphas that identifies others of their kind—helping those in need and stopping those that are dangerous. Rosen himself has no super abilities, but is good at understanding and dealing with people. He swims two miles per day in his pool and grows his own herbs.
 Ryan Cartwright as Gary Bell – A young, autistic man who is socially awkward but functional to a degree. A prodigious savant, his ability is transduction: he sees electromagnetic radiation of all wavelengths and can process information as fast as any computer. In season two, he develops the ability to find the wavelengths of forks, trees and other non-electrical items when faced with no technology.
 Warren Christie as Cameron Hicks – A former Marine with "hyperkinesis", meaning his brain can process movement at a much faster rate than normal. He can achieve amazing athletic feats of timing, and has superhuman reflexes and perfect accuracy with firearms or thrown objects: he can, for example, accurately predict trajectory by eyesight. His abilities are unreliable, however, as he cannot always perform under stress. In the first episode he is found to have an abnormal growth in his brain. He is found by the team working in a supermarket after they find video of him as a child pitching a perfect baseball game. He has one child who is rarely in his life. In season one, he has a relationship with Nina. In season two, he develops a relationship with Dr. Rosen's daughter, Dani. He becomes obsessed with the idea that his son has an Alpha ability, and constantly puts him in situations to test for such an ability.
 Azita Ghanizada as Rachel Pirzad – A former CIA linguist with the ability to "heighten" any of her five senses (sight, smell, taste, hearing, or touch) to extreme levels, by disabling the others. She can, for instance, view things at a microscopic level or analyse chemical composition by scent. The permanent heightening of her senses, along with her synesthesia, makes it hard for her to interact socially, and she has difficulty maintaining relationships with the opposite sex. In season two, she learns how to further control her senses.
 Laura Mennell as Nina Theroux – A young woman who can mentally "push" people into doing whatever she verbally asks of them. Her diagnosis is "hyperinduction". Before joining the team, she used her power for personal gain. Consequently, she believes she (unintentionally) pushed her boyfriend and father into committing suicide. She hopes to redeem herself by helping Dr. Rosen. Her character seems to have been with Rosen the longest, and she is the closest to him. A running gag in the first season is that she always has a different car that she has apparently "borrowed" by pushing someone. Pushing too hard or too much on a person can cause brain death. Nina has good control of her ability; people with her ability have difficulty controlling how they use it, and can become power-hungry. FBI agents who interview her refuse to make eye contact, or insist on wearing dark sunglasses, in fear of being pushed. During Season 1, Gary mentions that her ability to push does not work on him. Her memory of her past is dark and haunted by her pushing others. Her father committed suicide after being pushed one too many times to not want to leave his wife when Nina was a child. In an episode in season two, Nina succumbs to her power-hunger, but then tries to make up for her mistakes. She is shown to be reluctant to use her ability.
 Malik Yoba as Bill Harken – A former FBI agent who can activate his endocrinal fight or flight response at will, resulting in increased durability, endurance, speed and strength. His diagnosis is enhanced strength from flight-or-fight response. He cannot keep this up for long, however, due to the stress caused to his body. He was suspended from the FBI due to anger issues resulting from the stress of using his ability. Initially, he is rude and pushy with his teammates, especially Rachel and Gary. As season one progresses, however, his relationship with the team improves and he is no longer known as "mean Bill".
 Erin Way as Kat (Season 2) – A mysterious, free-spirited young loner whose enhanced procedural memory allows her to pick up any skill at a glance, but at the cost of her long-term declarative memories. Due to the information she constantly processes, she forgets whatever information she has learned after one month, although she retains the skills she has acquired. Dr. Rosen gives her a video camera to help her remember. She struggles in particular with a memory involving a lady in a blue dress.

Production

Development
Originally known as Section 8, Alphas was initially developed by Zak Penn and co-creator Michael Karnow in 2006. The series was then shopped around to various networks, with some interest from both NBC and ABC. In late 2007, ABC picked up the series with an initial six episode order. However, complications arising from the 2007–2008 Writers Guild of America strike derailed the project. On August 5, 2009, after almost two further years of shopping the show around to the broadcast and cable networks, Syfy placed a pilot order. Zak Penn and Michael Karnow wrote the pilot. Jack Bender was attached to the project as the director, with Gail Berman and Lloyd Braun serving as executive producers.

Casting began in August 2010. Filming of the pilot was done in Toronto, Canada.

Alphas was ordered to series on December 8, 2010, by Syfy to air in the summer of 2011. The series is a co-production between BermanBraun and Universal Cable Productions. Along with the series pickup, Syfy also announced that veteran Sci-Fi producer Ira Steven Behr had been picked to serve as executive producer and showrunner.

Episodes

Season 1 (2011)

Season 2 (2012)

Reception

Critical reception
Alphas has received mixed reviews. It earned a score of 63 on Metacritic. The New York Post said of the first episode: "Alphas is fun, sure, but it has a 'been there, done that' feel."
TV Fanatic gave the show an average review saying, "Everything Alphas brought to the table has been done before."
The New York Times gave the show a negative review: "It's neither here nor there: low on sci-fi mystery and intrigue and not yet convincing as ensemble drama. Right now it feels like the beta version."

Variety gave a positive review: "At first blush, though, give Alphas high marks for effort and ingenuity, demonstrating a TV show needn't provide major pyrotechnics or a reinvented wheel to lay the groundwork for solid summer entertainment where the characters, somewhat refreshingly, are only sort-of super."

The Los Angeles Times gave the pilot a positive review: "Alphas deftly balances all the building blocks of great genrenonhuman abilities, twisty plot, cool special effects, smart dialogue and characters you want to spend more time with. And that's the most impressive superpower of all."

After eight episodes had aired, Maureen Ryan of AOL TV called it the summer's most promising new drama: "Not only has Alphas successfully avoided many of the pitfalls that have bedeviled other superhero-flavored projects, it's done a good job of balancing character-driven moments with taut, well-paced storytelling."

Ratings
The pilot episode premiered with 2.5 million total viewers, scoring 1.2 million viewers in the 18–49 demographic and 1.3 million in the 25–54 demographic, making it Syfy's most watched debut in two years. Live + 7 day ratings for the series premiere updated those numbers to 3.6 million total viewers, scoring 1.7 million viewers in the 18–49 demographic and 1.8 million in the 25–54 demographic. By the 11th episode (its season finale) however, the ratings had dropped to 1.16 million total viewers.

In the UK the show was broadcast on Tuesdays. The first episode had 666,000 viewers altogether, 595,000 live and 71,000 on timeshift. When the second episode aired, the viewer count dipped to 469,000 together, live and on timeshift. Despite the fall in viewers on a Tuesday showing, the show has become popular in the UK with Friday repeats rounding up around 150,000 viewers.

U.S. ratings

United Kingdom ratings

In popular culture
In episode 21 of season six of the sitcom The Big Bang Theory entitled "The Closure Alternative", the unresolved cliffhanger ending of Alphas causes character Sheldon Cooper distress about not having 'closure', as a lead-in to one of that show's plot lines.

International broadcasting

References

External links

 
 

2010s American drama television series
2011 American television series debuts
2012 American television series endings
American action television series
American adventure television series
2010s American science fiction television series
English-language television shows
Superhero television shows
Syfy original programming
Television shows set in New York City
Television series by Universal Content Productions
Television shows filmed in Toronto
Serial drama television series
Fictional government investigations of the paranormal